Anthony Roger Santander (born October 19, 1994) is a Venezuelan professional baseball outfielder for the Baltimore Orioles of Major League Baseball (MLB). He made his major league debut in 2017.

Early life
Santander was born on Margarita Island, off the Venezuelan coast, but grew up in and feels more connected to the mainland municipality Agua Blanca, where he returns every winter.

Career

Cleveland Indians
Santander signed with the Cleveland Indians as an international free agent in July 2011. He made his professional debut in 2012 for the Arizona League Indians. From 2013 to 2015 he played for the Lake County Captains. He injured his right elbow in 2013, and missed part of the 2014 season—when he batted .184/.260/.270 for the Captains—with a right elbow strain. He also played in eight games for the Mahoning Valley Scrappers in 2015. Santander spent 2016 with the Lynchburg Hillcats where he posted a .290 batting average with 20 home runs and 95 RBIs.

Baltimore Orioles
Santander was selected by the Baltimore Orioles in the 2016 Rule 5 draft. He made his major league debut on August 18, 2017, at Camden Yards, Baltimore against the Los Angeles Angels. In 30 at bats he batted .267/.258/.367.

Santander became a favorite of over 4,000 scouts and girl guides from the United Kingdom who had followed their trip to the World Scout Jamboree in West Virginia by attending the Orioles' 6–5 victory over the Toronto Blue Jays at Camden Yards on August 4, 2019. Seated in the left field lower deck right behind him, the scouts boisterously cheered for him whenever he caught a fly ball for almost the entire game after he had thrown a baseball as a souvenir to them early in the contest, and also because they recognised the European bank Santander. The Orioles responded to the exuberance by displaying a message on the center field video board referring to the scouts as the "Official International Anthony Santander Fan Club." He matched teammate Renato Núñez's achievement from eleven days prior with his own first-ever five-hit game in an 8–3 home win over the Tampa Bay Rays three weeks later on August 25. In 93 games, he hit 20 home runs with 59 runs batted in.

In 37 games for the Orioles in 2020, Santander batted .261/.315/.575 with 11 home runs and 32 RBI. He was awarded the 2020 Louis M. Hatter Most Valuable Oriole Award by members of the local media. On February 5, 2021, Santander lost his arbitration hearing against the Orioles and had his 2021 salary set at $2.1MM instead of $2.475MM.

In mid June 2022, Santander was placed on the restricted list ahead of a series in Toronto against the Blue Jays due to being unvaccinated against COVID-19. He tied an MLB record set by Ken Caminiti in 1996 by hitting home runs from both sides of the plate in a game for the fourth time in a single season in a 13–9 loss to the Boston Red Sox at Fenway Park on September 27, 2022. He also became the first Orioles player with three multi-homer games in a four-game span.

In 2022 he led major league batters in pop up percentage (15.8%), and batted .240/.318/.455 in 574 at bats.

On January 13, 2023, Santander agreed to a one-year, $7.4 million contract with the Orioles, avoiding salary arbitration.

International career
Santander was selected to the Venezuela national team at the 2023 World Baseball Classic.

References

External links

1994 births
Living people
Arizona League Indians players
Baltimore Orioles players
Bowie Baysox players
Frederick Keys players
Mahoning Valley Scrappers players
Lake County Captains players
Lynchburg Hillcats players
Major League Baseball outfielders
Major League Baseball players from Venezuela
Navegantes del Magallanes players
Norfolk Tides players
Venezuelan expatriate baseball players in the United States
Tigres de Aragua players
2023 World Baseball Classic players